Yogi Rock is a rock on Mars that was discovered during the Mars Pathfinder mission in 1997, and named by Geoffrey A. Landis. The rocks found on the mission were named after famous icons and figures, and Yogi Rock was thought to resemble the head of a bear looking away from the spacecraft.  As a result, it was named for the famed cartoon character Yogi Bear.

The rock was the first on Mars found to be made of basalt, which suggests previous volcanic activity in the region as basalt is an igneous rock. The smoothness of the surface also suggested the past existence of water in the region.  Yogi was also the first large rock reached by the Sojourner rover and was analyzed by an alpha proton X-ray spectrometer to determine its composition.

Images of Sojourner approaching Yogi used in the opening credits of Star Trek: Enterprise made that television program the first science fiction television or film production to use footage taken on another planet.

See also
 List of rocks on Mars
 Barnacle Bill (Martian rock)

References

External links
 

Rocks on Mars
Mars Pathfinder